Milton Hywel Jones (born 16 May 1964) is an English comedian. His style of humour is based on one-liners involving puns delivered in a deadpan and slightly neurotic style. Jones has had various shows on BBC Radio 4 and was a recurring guest panellist on Mock the Week. He won the Perrier comedy award for best newcomer in 1996, and in 2012, Another Case of Milton Jones was awarded silver in the 'Best Comedy' category at the 30th Sony Radio Academy awards. 
Jones tours the UK periodically and is a regular performer at The Comedy Store in London and Manchester.

Jones wrote the surrealist, partially biographical novel Where Do Comedians Go When They Die?: Journeys of a Stand-Up (2009).

Personal life 
Jones was born and raised in Kew, London. His father is from South Wales. He attended Middlesex Polytechnic, gaining a diploma in dramatic art in 1985. He married Caroline Church in 1986 and they have three children. They live in the St Margarets area of Richmond upon Thames in London. He supports Arsenal.

Jones is a practising Christian and often performs in churches and at Christian festivals.

He is a patron of the charity Chance for Childhood.

Radio programmes 
The Very World of Milton Jones
The House of Milton Jones
Another Case of Milton Jones
Thanks a Lot, Milton Jones!

Books 
 Ten Second Sermons [DLT Books: 2011]  (Christian book with biblical and church-based one liners)
 Even More Concise 10 Second Sermons [DLT Books: 2013]  (the sequel to Ten Second Sermons)
 Where Do Comedians Go When They Die?

TV work 
 Milton Jones's House of Rooms (2012 pilot of a sitcom for Channel 4)
 28 Acts in 28 Minutes (BBC, 60 seconds of stand-up)
 The Strangerers (Sky One)
 The Comedy Store
 The World Stands Up
 Live at Jongleurs
 Music Hall Meltdown (BBC, one-off variety programme)
 Planet Mirth
 Mock the Week
 Michael McIntyre's Comedy Roadshow
 Lee Mack's All Star Cast
 Zulu Comedy Galla in Denmark
 Gonzola's Comedy Fest
 Live at the Apollo (two appearances)

Jones was also a writer for TV shows: he worked on The One Ronnie, Not Going Out and Laughing Cow.

Stand-up DVDs
Live Universe Tour – Part 1 – Earth (2009)
Lion Whisperer – (21 November 2011)
On The Road – (25 November 2013)

References

External links 
 
 Official website of Milton Jones' agent
 Chortle profile
 Milton Jones interview, The Beaver, 9 January 2007
 Milton Jones at the British Film Institute
 

1964 births
Living people
20th-century English comedians
21st-century English comedians
Alumni of Middlesex University
Comedians from London
English Christians
English people of Welsh descent
English stand-up comedians
People from Kew, London